Stomatella auricula, common name the false ear shell, is a species of sea snail, a marine gastropod mollusk in the family Trochidae, the top snails.

Description
The size of the shell varies between 5 mm and 20 mm. The shell has an elongated, rather narrow Haliotis-shape. It is smooth, polished, except for the growth lines near the lip. The body whorl is not spirally striate. Its color is golden, finely reticulated with light golden-brown, and showing several broad and narrow spiral crimson bands. The coloration is variable within wide limits. The color varies from carmine to white and even blackish, with more or less numerous white
spots and often darker, articulated, spiral bands. The upper whorls are commonly of another colour than the body whorl. The outline is long and the polished surface show s no spiral striae except on the penultimate and beginning of the body whorl, where fine, scarcely impressed, close spiral lines can be seen under a strong lens. A few separated impressed striae extend along the columellar margin of the base. The columellar margin is slightly bowed or concave. The upper surface has subregular radiating striae. The ground color consists of a fine zigzagged mottling of whitish and light brown, through which the underlying nacre shines with a golden iridescence. There are several narrow spiral lines articulated remotely with white dots. And on the latter part of the whorl these are replaced by bands or lines of crimson. The aperture is oblong. Its posterior angle is filled by a pearly callus. The outer lip is sinuous. The lip margin is not bowed, but in one plane. There is a slightly projecting angle where the columella joins the basal lip. So that when lying on its face the peristome is in contact with a plane surface all the way around except the median part of the columellar lip.

(Description as Stomatella varia) The size of the shell varies between 6 mm and 17 mm.
The polished shell is ear-shaped with an ovate-oblong form.,The back is equally convex. The left side is striated. Its color is buff, varied with white and red. The spire is rather prominent, erect and acuminate.

This is a pretty little species, usually confounded with Stomatella impertusa, but easily distinguished when its profile is examined. The dorsum is equally convex and polished, and the spire is rather prominent, erect and acuminated.

Distribution
This species occurs in the Red Sea and in the Central and East Indian Ocean off Mozambique, Aldabra and Chagos; in the Western Pacific; in the South Pacific off Tonga;and off Japan, the Philippines, Polynesia and Queensland, Australia.

References

 Quoy, H. E. Th. & Gaimard, P., 1834 Mollusques. Zoologie. In Voyage de découvertes de l'Astrolabe, exécuté par ordre du Roi, pendant les années 1826-1827-1828-1829, sous le commandement de M. J. Dumont d'Urville, vol. 3(1), p. 1-366
 Angas, G.F. 1865. On the marine molluscan fauna of the Province of South Australia, with a list of all the species known up to the present time, together with remarks on their habitats and distribution, etc. Proceedings of the Zoological Society of London 1865: 155–"180" 
 Smith. Marine Mollusca. Fauna and Geography of the Maldive and Laccadive Archipelago, p. 618, N° 271.
 Cotton, B.C. 1945. Southern Australian Gastropoda. Part 1. Streptoneura. Transactions of the Royal Society of South Australia 69(1): 150–171
 Cotton, B.C. 1959. South Australian Mollusca. Archaeogastropoda. Handbook of the Flora and Fauna of South Australia. Adelaide : South Australian Government Printer 449 pp.
 Sharabati, D. 1984. Red Sea Shells. London : KPI Limited 128 pp.
 Hickman, C.S. & McLean, J.H. 1990. Systematic revision and suprageneric classification of trochacean gastropods. Natural History Museum of Los Angeles County. Science Series 35: i–vi, 1–169
 Wilson, B. 1993. Australian Marine Shells. Prosobranch Gastropods. Kallaroo, Western Australia : Odyssey Publishing Vol. 1 408 pp.
 Higo, S., Callomon, P. & Goto, Y. (2001) Catalogue and Bibliography of the Marine Shell-Bearing Mollusca of Japan. Gastropoda Bivalvia Polyplacophora Scaphopoda Type Figures. Elle Scientific Publications, Yao, Japan, 208 pp
 Hedley, C. 1907. The Mollusca of Mast Head Reef, Capricorn Group, Queensland, part II. Proceedings of the Linnean Society of New South Wales 32: 476–513, pls 16-21 
 Cernohorsky. W. O. (1972). Marine Shells of the Pacific. Vol. II. Pacific Publications, Sydney, 411 pp.
 Salvat, B. & Rives, C. 1975. Coquillages de Polynésie. Tahiti : Papeete 391 pp
 Rosenberg, G. 1992. Encyclopedia of Seashells. Dorset: New York. 224 pp.
 Bosch D.T., Dance S.P., Moolenbeek R.G. & Oliver P.G. (1995) Seashells of eastern Arabia. Dubai: Motivate Publishing. 296 pp.
 Moolenbeek, R.G. 1995. Gastropods (Gastropoda). pp. 24–186 in Dance, S.P. (ed). Seashells of Eastern Arabia. Dubai : Motivate Publishing. 37, sp. 57
 Sheppard, A (1984). The molluscan fauna of Chagos (Indian Ocean) and an analysis of its broad distribution patterns. Coral Reefs 3: 43-50
 Verbinnen, G. & Dirkx, M. (2005). Red Sea Mollusca. Part 19. Stomatellidae. Gloria Maris 44(1–2): 24–26.
 Zuschin, M., Janssen, R. & Baal, C. (2009). Gastropods and their habitats from the northern Red Sea (Egypt: Safaga). Part 1: Patellogastropoda, Vetigastropoda and Cycloneritimorpha. Annalen des Naturhistorischen Museums in Wien

External links
 
 Lamarck, J.B.P.A. de M. 1816. Liste des objets représentés dans les planches de cette livraison. pp. 1–16 in Lamarck, J.B.P.A. de M. Tableau encyclopédique et méthodique des trois règnes de la nature. Vers, coquilles, mollusques et polypiers. Paris : Agasse Part 23 pp. 1–16, pls. 391–488
 Adams, A. 1850. An arrangement of Stomatellidae, including the characters of a new genus Cumingia, with some additional generic characters. Proceedings of the Zoological Society of London 1850(18): 29–40, pl. 8
 Dufo, H. (1840). Observations sur les Mollusques marins, terrestres et fluviatiles des îles Sèchelles et des Amirantes. Annales des Sciences Naturelles. (2)14: 45-80, 166-221
 Herbert D.G. (2015). An annotated catalogue and bibliography of the taxonomy, synonymy and distribution of the Recent Vetigastropoda of South Africa (Mollusca). Zootaxa. 4049(1): 1-98

auricula
Gastropods described in 1816